Ezh (Ʒ ʒ) ,  also called the "tailed z", is a letter whose lower case form is used in the International Phonetic Alphabet (IPA), representing the voiced postalveolar fricative consonant.  For example, the pronunciation of "si" in vision  and precision , or the "s" in treasure .  See also the letter Ž as used in many Slavic languages, the Persian alphabet letter ژ, the Cyrillic letter Ж, and the Esperanto letter Ĵ.

Ezh is also used as a letter in some orthographies of Laz and Skolt Sami, both by itself, and with a caron (Ǯ ǯ). In Laz, these represent voiceless alveolar affricate  and its ejective counterpart , respectively. It also appears in the orthography of some African languages, for example in the Aja language of Benin and the Dagbani language of Ghana, where the uppercase variant looks like a reflected sigma (Σ).

Origin

As a phonetic symbol, it originates with Isaac Pitman's English Phonotypic Alphabet in 1847, as a z with an added hook. The symbol is based on medieval cursive forms of Latin z, evolving into the blackletter z letter. In Unicode, however, the blackletter  ("tailed z" , German ) is considered a glyph variant of z, and not an ezh.
Humanist Gian Giorgio Trissino proposed in 1524 a reform of Italian orthography introducing ezh as an uppercase  for the  sound.

In contexts where "tailed z" is used in contrast to tail-less z, notably in standard transcription of Middle High German, Unicode ʒ is sometimes used, strictly speaking incorrectly. Unicode offers  ȥ "z with hook" as a grapheme for Middle High German coronal fricative instead.

Similar shapes

Relation to yogh 
In Unicode 1.0, the character was unified with the unrelated character yogh, which was not correctly added to Unicode until Unicode 3.0. Historically, ezh is derived from Latin z, but yogh is derived from Latin g by way of insular G (and incidentally giving rise to the English mispronunciation of the Scottish surname [and business] Menzies as  instead of ). The characters look very similar and do not appear alongside each other in any alphabet. To differentiate between the two more clearly, the Oxford University Press and the Early English Text Society extend the uppermost tip of the 'yogh' into a little curvature upward.

Relation to the digit three
The ezh looks similar to the common form of the figure three (3). To differentiate between the two characters, Ezh includes the sharp zigzag of the letter z, while the number is usually curved. This still remains a problem though, as some type fonts (found on clock faces among other things) use a figure for "3" identical in shape to an ezh.
In the Cyrillic script handwritings, the digit 3 is written as an Ezh to distinguish it from the letter Ze.

Similarity to hiragana ro 
Ezh looks similar to ろ, the Japanese hiragana letter for the mora "ro". However, the central corner of ろ points out further away to the left than that of ezh.

Vague ties to the Cyrillic 'Ze'
 The Cyrillic letter Ze, written as З (capitalized) or з (Lower Case), has a similar body to Ezh. As customary, the Cyrillic script has a stiffer structure, but both letters have common roots in historical cursive forms of 'Z', taken from the Greek letter Zeta.

The pronunciations of Latin Ezh and Cyrillic Ze, however, are different phonemes: while /ʒ/ stands for the s in the word vision, Russian Ze (З) stands for z as in zebra. For the /ʒ/ phoneme, Cyrillic uses the letter Zhe (Ж).

Older Russian typewriters, often to save space, sometimes used З (Ze) to write the numeral form of 3.

Usage

Language orthographies

In the International Phonetic Alphabet (IPA) it represents the voiced postalveolar fricative consonant.  For example: vision . It is pronounced as the "s" in "treasure" or the "si" in the word "precision".

It is used with that value in Uropi.

It is used in the "International Standard" orthography, as devised by Marcel Courthiade for Romani.

It was also used in an obsolete Latin alphabet for writing Komi, where it represented  (similar to English j). In the modern Cyrillic alphabet, this sound is written as дз.

Also during Latinisation in the USSR was used in the project of Unified Northern Alphabet and other alphabets of the people of the Soviet Union during the 1920–1930s.

Ezh as an abbreviation for dram 
In Unicode, a standard designed to allow symbols from all writing systems to be represented and manipulated by computers, the ezh (alternatively ℨ) is used as the symbol to represent the abbreviation for drachm, an apothecaries' system unit of mass.

Encoding and ligatures
The Unicode code points are U+01B7 for Ʒ and U+0292 for ʒ.

The IPA historically allowed for ezh to be ligatured to other letters; some of these ligatures have been added to the Unicode standard.
Dezh (ʤ) ligatures ezh with the letter D (U+02A4).
Lezh (ɮ) ligatures ezh with the letter L (U+026E).
Tezh (tʒ) (uppercase form TƷ) ligatures ezh with the letter T (U+A728 for Ꜩ and U+A729 for ꜩ).

 is used in the Uralic Phonetic Alphabet.

 was previously used in the IPA

Typing character 
For Mac: Option⌥ + :, followed by Shift+Z or Z respectively.

See also 
 Unified Northern Alphabet
 Reversed Ezh (Ƹ ƹ)
 Abkhazian Dze (Ӡ ӡ)
 Cyrillic Ze (З з)

References

External links 
 Michael Everson's essay On the derivation of Yogh and Ezh

Phonetic transcription symbols
Latin-script letters